Anthony G. Becht (born August 8, 1977) is a former American football tight end who played in the National Football League (NFL). He is currently the head coach of the St. Louis BattleHawks of the XFL. He was drafted by the New York Jets 27th overall in the 2000 NFL Draft. He played college football at West Virginia. He was also a member of the Tampa Bay Buccaneers, St. Louis Rams, Arizona Cardinals and Kansas City Chiefs.

Becht was hired by ESPN as a college football analyst in 2013. He is also a co-host of the "Football Fan Shop" on the Home Shopping Network. In 2019, he was the tight ends coach of the San Diego Fleet of the Alliance of American Football.
Anthony Becht worked as an Analyst for some Sunday night Football games on Westwood One in 2021.

Early years
Becht, a graduate of Monsignor Bonner High School in Drexel Hill, Pennsylvania, was 6'5" and 205 pounds coming out of high school. Becht was an all-city, all-Catholic conference and all-county selection as a senior after recording 47 receptions for 693 yards.  Becht accepted a football scholarship from West Virginia.

College career
At the end of Becht's college career, he ranked second among tight ends at the school with 83 catches for 1,173 yards, a 14.1 average of yards per catch, and 10 touchdowns. Becht was an honorable mention for All-American as a senior and was named second-team All-Big East as a junior and senior, along with being team captain and MVP. He graduated with a bachelor's degree in Marketing.

Professional career

New York Jets
Becht was selected by the Jets with a traded draft pick from Tampa Bay. As a rookie in 2000 for the Jets, Becht played in 14 games, missing two due to an ankle sprain. He was a starter for 10 games and totaled 16 receptions for 144 yards and two touchdowns on the season. Becht ranked third among the rookie tight ends with receptions, behind Green Bay's Bubba Franks and Cleveland's Aaron Shea.

In 2001, Becht started all 16 games and recorded 36 receptions for 321 yards and five touchdowns. He tied former Jets' tight end Kyle Brady for the most receptions by an AFC tight end. His five scores were only beat by Colts' Marcus Pollard and Chiefs' Tony Gonzalez. Becht recorded consecutive game-winning touchdown catches in weeks 13 and 14.

In 2002, Becht once again started all 16 games and tallied 28 receptions, 243 yards, and a career-high tying five scores. Becht caught one pass for eight yards and served as a key blocker in the 41–0 win over the Colts in the AFC Wild Card playoff game and recorded three receptions for 14 yards in the AFC Divisional Playoff loss at Oakland.

In 2003, Becht set career-highs of 40 receptions for 356 yards and he included four TD catches while starting all sixteen games once again. Becht caught a career-best six passes, including a one-yard touchdown, and gained 32 yards at Miami in the season finale.

As his final season as a Jet in 2004, Becht had a career-low 13 receptions, for also lows of 100 yards and only 1 touchdown. He did manage to catch a touchdown pass in the Jets Wild Card win over the San Diego Chargers. In New York City, Becht totaled 1,146 yards receiving with 17 touchdowns off of 133 receptions.

Tampa Bay Buccaneers
In his first year in Tampa Bay in 2005, Becht recorded 16 receptions, much like his rookie year, 112 yards but no touchdowns as his career began to slide downward. Becht competed with rookie Alex Smith for the tight end spot, who the Bucs picked up in the 2005 NFL Draft.

In 2006, Becht saw himself being replaced by the rookie, Smith. Still, Becht grabbed 18 receptions for 115 yards and a score, from mainly rookie Bruce Gradkowski.

In 2007, Becht's productivity decreased even more. He finished the season with only 5 receptions for 201 yards and 2 touchdowns.

St. Louis Rams
On March 6, 2008, he signed with the St. Louis Rams. Becht joined fellow-former Mountaineers Marc Magro and Marc Bulger on the Rams squad. Becht played one season with the team before his release on March 12, 2009.

Arizona Cardinals
Becht signed with the Arizona Cardinals on March 19, 2009. In the 2009–2010 season, Becht had 61 yards on 10 catches, averaging 6.1 yards per catch. He also had one receiving touchdown. On September 3, 2010 Becht was released as part of final cuts for the 2010 NFL Season.

Kansas City Chiefs
Becht signed with the Kansas City Chiefs on August 25, 2011, but was released on September 5. The Chiefs re-signed him on September 16. Becht was released by the Chiefs again, so there could be room for tight end Jake O'Connell. On October 26, he was signed once again, by the Chiefs. On December 18, 2011 Becht had 2 catches for 20 yards.

NFL statistics

Regular season

Postseason

Coaching career
On April 13, 2022, it was announced that Becht would serve as the head coach of the St. Louis BattleHawks of the XFL in 2023.

Head coaching record

XFL

References

External links
New York Jets bio
St. Louis Rams bio
Tampa Bay Buccaneers bio

1977 births
Living people
People from Drexel Hill, Pennsylvania
Players of American football from Pennsylvania
American football tight ends
West Virginia Mountaineers football players
New York Jets players
Tampa Bay Buccaneers players
St. Louis Rams players
Arizona Cardinals players
Kansas City Chiefs players
College football announcers
San Diego Fleet coaches